The Paratroop Training Unit (RAAF) (PTU) was a unit of the Royal Australian Air Force (RAAF) during World War II, which served as the instruction centre for recruitment and training of the Australian Army paratroopers.
 
Formed in 1942, an advanced party left RAAF Laverton, Victoria and proceeded to RAAF Station Tocumwal,  New South Wales, under the command of Wing Commander P Glasscock. The Army Personnel attached to PTU were known as Group 244 RAAF Army (Z). The PTU relocated to RAAF Base Richmond, New South Wales in 1943.

References
1st Australian Parachute Battalion

RAAF training units
Airborne units and formations of Australia
Military parachuting training
RAAF